Laurent de Chazelles (28 July 1724 – 28 May 1808) was a French agronomist.

1724 births
1808 deaths
French agronomists
Scientists from Metz